The 1935 Hamilton municipal election was held on December 2, 1935 to select one Mayor, four Controllers, and sixteen members of the Hamilton, Ontario, City Council, two from each of the city's eight wards. Voters also cast ballots for trustees for the public school board, and in three plebiscites that sought to restructure elections for both city council and the public school board.

Campaign

The 1935 municipal campaign in Hamilton occurred at the height of the Great Depression, prompting municipal officials to consider cost-cutting measures in local government. In early November, 1935, Hamilton City Council began debating proposals to lengthen municipal campaigns and stagger elections so save on the cost of printing ballots and hiring polling workers. James Berry, the city clerk, advised council members that increasing the length of a city council term could save taxpayers $9,000 a year in election-related costs.

On Tuesday, November 5, council met to debate the matter. There was considerable confusion among members, who opted to submit a plebiscite question to the electorate asking if they were in favour of an increase in the term length for members of the Board of Control, city council, and school board from one year to two years. Almost immediately after passing the motion, the city's solicitor, A.J. Polson, informed Mayor Wilton that the motion was illegal, as it included wording regarding the Hamilton Board of Education. In passing this motion, it would have allowed supporters of Hamilton's Catholic School Board an opportunity to vote on the length of term of trustees for a school board other than the one they supported. At a follow-up meeting, council determined it would be appropriate to split the plebiscite into three questions, asking voters if they wanted a two-year term, if they preferred a staggered election, and asking public school supporters if they wanted to bring trustee elections in line with council's two-year plan.

Despite having been elected to Parliament, outgoing mayor Herbert Wilton inserted himself into the municipal campaign, giving a speech in late November, 1935, railing against council members who found themselves unable to deal with the financial stresses placed upon the city by the economic crisis in the country. "You complain about high taxation," Wilton said, addressing Hamilton's electorate, "and then vote to elect men who have never been able to successfully manage their own financial affairs." Wilton, a strong advocate for low taxes and classical liberal economic policy, implored voters to carefully manage municipal finances, which he referred to as a "$8,000,000 business concern." Wilton also took aim at members of the Communist Party, who were seeking election in the city's working-class north-end. Wilton spoke passionately against the atheism of their members and the economic problems in the Soviet Union at the time. "They preach and teach the doctrine of hate, place their dead in graves without Christian burial, and deny the existence of God," he argued.

The campaign was overtly partisan, with each political party's organization campaigning to elect candidates friendly to their platform. After the election, the Spectator declared that "Hamilton is still Tory Hamilton is the political affiliations of the new City Council may be taken as a criterion," Detailing the political affiliations of the members of council, the Spectator acknowledged that the mayor and 12 members of council were elected with the help of the local Conservative Party, five Liberals were returned, while Controller Nora-Frances Henderson and Ward 7 Alderman Donald Clark were members of the Reconstruction Party of Canada, with Ward 8 Alderman Agnes Sharpe serving as the only Cooperative Commonwealth Federation-affiliated member of council.

In addition to the efforts of the organized federal parties, there was a clandestine 'ghost' slate supported by local teachers who advocated for the election of William Morrison, and Board of Control candidates Don McFarlane, Thomas Lewington, and Andy Frame. This was in response to the affiliated candidates promising to press the Hamilton Board of Education to reverse pay cuts imposed on teachers thanks to the city's worsening economic situation.

Mayor

The mayoral race in 1935 was marked by incumbent mayor Herbert Wilton's election earlier that year to Parliament for the constituency of Hamilton West. Soon after his election, incumbent Controller Septimus DuMoulin and former Hamilton East MLA William Morrison, who had been unseated by Sam Lawrence a year earlier, both expressed an interest in contesting the mayoralty.

The city's Cooperative Commonwealth Federation establishment, organized and energized by Sam Lawrence's election to the Ontario legislature, had originally entertained plans to run a candidate for mayor, though they opted to forego that strategy, instead aiming to put up at least one candidate for election to the Board of Control, city council, and the public school board. The Liberal Party as well originally considered running local real estate agent F. Kent Hamilton for the office to challenge DuMoulin and Morrison, who were both heavily involved in local Conservative politics. They ultimately decided against this strategy.

On nomination day, DuMoulin and Morrison were nominated, along with Communist Party candidate John Hunter, local baker Ed Goodfellow, and lawyer William H.W. Wardrope.  In their nomination speeches, each candidate outlined core planks in their platform, with DuMoulin emphasizing his experience and a desire to see water-rates lowered, Goodfellow outlining a plan to reduce the city's debt, Wardrope advocating increasing taxes on the wealthy, Hunter proposing a graduated property tax with exemptions for those making less than $3,000 a year, and Morrison calling for a continuation of Wilton's program of keeping taxes and spending low.

|-
!rowspan="2" colspan="2"|Candidate
!rowspan="2" colspan="1"|Affiliation
!colspan="2"|Popular vote
!rowspan="2"| Elected?
|-
! Votes
! %
|-

| style="text-align:left;" | William Morrison
| style="text-align:right;" | Independent Conservative
| style="text-align:right;" |12,910
| style="text-align:right;" |34.7%
| style="text-align:center;" |
|-

| style="text-align:left;" | Septimus DuMoulin
| style="text-align:right;" | Independent Conservative
| style="text-align:right;" |9,069
| style="text-align:right;" |24.4%
| style="text-align:center;" |
|-

| style="text-align:left;" | William Wardrope
| style="text-align:right;" | Independent
| style="text-align:right;" |7,883
| style="text-align:right;" |21.2%
| style="text-align:center;" |
|-

| style="text-align:left;" | Edmund Goodfellow
| style="text-align:right;" | Independent
| style="text-align:right;" |5,106
| style="text-align:right;" |13.7%
| style="text-align:center;" |
|-
| style="background-color:#C41E3A;" |
| style="text-align:left;" | John Hunter
| style="text-align:right;" | Communist
| style="text-align:right;" |2,186
| style="text-align:right;" |6%
| style="text-align:right;" |
|-
| style="text-align:right;background-color:#FFFFFF;" colspan="3" |Total votes
| style="text-align:right;background-color:#FFFFFF;" colspan="1" |37,154
| style="text-align:right;background-color:#FFFFFF;" colspan="2" |
|- 
| style="text-align:right;background-color:#FFFFFF;" colspan="3" |Registered voters
| style="text-align:right;background-color:#FFFFFF;" |
| style="text-align:right;background-color:#FFFFFF;" colspan="1" |
| style="text-align:left;background-color:#FFFFFF;" colspan="1" |
|- 
| style="text-align:left;" colspan="6" |Note: Candidate campaign colours are used as a visual differentiation between candidates and to indicate affiliation.
|- 
| style="text-align:left;" colspan="13" |Sources: "Morrison is Swept into Mayor's Chair," Hamilton Spectator, December 3, 1935, pp. 5.
|}

Board of Control

|-
!rowspan="2" colspan="2"|Candidate
!rowspan="2" colspan="1"|Affiliation
!colspan="2"|Popular vote
!rowspan="2"| Elected?
|-
! Votes
! %
|-

| style="text-align:left;" | Freeman Treleaven (incumbent)
| style="text-align:right;" | Independent Liberal
| style="text-align:right;" |15,406
| style="text-align:right;" |17.7%
| style="text-align:center;" |
|-

| style="text-align:left;" | Samuel Nelson
| style="text-align:right;" | Independent Conservative
| style="text-align:right;" |14,939
| style="text-align:right;" |17.2%
| style="text-align:center;" |
|-

| style="text-align:left;" | Nora-Frances Henderson (incumbent)
| style="text-align:right;" | Independent Reconstructionist
| style="text-align:right;" |14,088
| style="text-align:right;" |16.2%
| style="text-align:center;" |
|-

| style="text-align:left;" | Donald McFarlane
| style="text-align:right;" | Independent Conservative
| style="text-align:right;" |12,747
| style="text-align:right;" |14.65%
| style="text-align:center;" |
|-

| style="text-align:left;" | Andy Frame
| style="text-align:right;" | Independent
| style="text-align:right;" |11,628
| style="text-align:right;" |13.37%
| style="text-align:center;" |
|-

| style="text-align:left;" | John Mitchell
| style="text-align:right;" | Cooperative Commonwealth Federation
| style="text-align:right;" |8,600
| style="text-align:right;" |9.89%
| style="text-align:center;" |
|-

| style="text-align:left;" | Thomas Lewington
| style="text-align:right;" | Independent
| style="text-align:right;" |11,628
| style="text-align:right;" |9.4%
| style="text-align:center;" |
|-

| style="text-align:left;" | Charles McCabe
| style="text-align:right;" | Independent
| style="text-align:right;" |7,197
| style="text-align:right;" |8.78%
| style="text-align:center;" |
|-

| style="text-align:left;" | George Jones
| style="text-align:right;" | Independent
| style="text-align:right;" |2,268
| style="text-align:right;" |2.6%
| style="text-align:center;" |
|-
| style="text-align:right;background-color:#FFFFFF;" colspan="3" |Total votes
| style="text-align:right;background-color:#FFFFFF;" colspan="1" |
| style="text-align:right;background-color:#FFFFFF;" colspan="2" |
|- 
| style="text-align:right;background-color:#FFFFFF;" colspan="3" |Registered voters
| style="text-align:right;background-color:#FFFFFF;" |
| style="text-align:right;background-color:#FFFFFF;" colspan="1" |
| style="text-align:left;background-color:#FFFFFF;" colspan="1" |
|- 
| style="text-align:left;" colspan="6" |Note: Candidate campaign colours are used as a visual differentiation between candidates and to indicate affiliation.
|- 
| style="text-align:left;" colspan="13" |Sources: "Controllers' Recapitulation," Hamilton Spectator, December 3, 1935, pp. 15."Conservative Majority in New City Council," Hamilton Spectator, December 3, 1935, pp. 7.
|}

Plebiscites

|- style="text-align:center;background:#E9E9E9;"
! colspan="5" | Hamilton, Ontario Municipal Election1935 Plebiscites
|- style="text-align:center;background:#E9E9E9;"
! rowspan="2" style="text-align:left;" | Question
! colspan="2" |  Yes
! colspan="2" | No
|- style="text-align:center;background:#E9E9E9;"
! Votes !! % !! Votes !! %
|-
| style="text-align:left;" | Are you in favour of electing members of Hamilton City Council to a term of two years?  || 10,028 || 32.13% || 21,182 ||  
|- 
| style="text-align:left;" | Are you in favour of the Board of Control and aldermen being electedso that one-half the number are elected for a term of two years, the mayorto be elected for a term of two years?  || 7,973 || 28.2% || 20,289 ||  
|- 
| style="text-align:left;" | Are you in favour of all the trustees of the Hamilton Board of Education being electedfor a term of two years?  || 11,543 || 40.38% || 17,043 ||  
|- 
| style="text-align:right;background-color:#FFFFFF;" colspan="1" |Total votes
| style="text-align:right;background-color:#FFFFFF;" colspan="4" style="text-align:left;"|
|- 
| style="text-align:right;background-color:#FFFFFF;" colspan="1" |Registered voters
| style="text-align:right;background-color:#FFFFFF;" colspan="4" style="text-align:left;"|
|- 
| style="text-align:left;" colspan="13" |Sources: "Plan to Change Voting System Junked," Hamilton Spectator, December 3, 1935, pp. 15.
|}

Aldermen

Ward One

|-
!rowspan="2" colspan="2"|Candidate
!rowspan="2" colspan="1"|Affiliation
!colspan="2"|Popular vote
!rowspan="2"| Elected?
|-
! Votes
! %
|-

| style="text-align:left;" | William McFarland (incumbent)
| style="text-align:right;" | Independent Conservative
| style="text-align:right;" |4,194
| style="text-align:right;" |
| style="text-align:center;" |
|-

| style="text-align:left;" | Orville Walsh (incumbent)
| style="text-align:right;" | Independent Conservative
| style="text-align:right;" |2,951
| style="text-align:right;" |
| style="text-align:center;" |
|-

| style="text-align:left;" | Charles Turner
| style="text-align:right;" | Cooperative Commonwealth Federation
| style="text-align:right;" |996
| style="text-align:right;" |
| style="text-align:center;" |
|-
| style="text-align:right;background-color:#FFFFFF;" colspan="3" |Total votes
| style="text-align:right;background-color:#FFFFFF;" colspan="1" |
| style="text-align:right;background-color:#FFFFFF;" colspan="2" |
|- 
| style="text-align:right;background-color:#FFFFFF;" colspan="3" |Registered voters
| style="text-align:right;background-color:#FFFFFF;" |
| style="text-align:right;background-color:#FFFFFF;" colspan="1" |
| style="text-align:left;background-color:#FFFFFF;" colspan="1" |
|- 
| style="text-align:left;" colspan="6" |Note: Candidate campaign colours are used as a visual differentiation between candidates and to indicate affiliation.
|- 
| style="text-align:left;" colspan="13" |Sources: "Recapitulation for the aldermen", Hamilton Spectator, December 3, 1935, pp. 15."Conservative Majority in New Council," Hamilton Spectator, December 3, 1935, pp. 7.
|}

Ward Two

|-
!rowspan="2" colspan="2"|Candidate
!rowspan="2" colspan="1"|Affiliation
!colspan="2"|Popular vote
!rowspan="2"| Elected?
|-
! Votes
! %
|-

| style="text-align:left;" | Beamer Hopkins 
| style="text-align:right;" | Independent Conservative
| style="text-align:right;" |2,184
| style="text-align:right;" |
| style="text-align:center;" |
|-

| style="text-align:left;" | William Ainslie (incumbent)
| style="text-align:right;" | Independent Liberal
| style="text-align:right;" |1,271
| style="text-align:right;" |
| style="text-align:center;" |
|-

| style="text-align:left;" | James Phin
| style="text-align:right;" | Independent
| style="text-align:right;" |1,182
| style="text-align:right;" |
| style="text-align:center;" |
|-

| style="text-align:left;" | Hugh Lennox
| style="text-align:right;" | Independent
| style="text-align:right;" |1,018
| style="text-align:right;" |
| style="text-align:center;" |
|-

| style="text-align:left;" | Lawrence Gatenby
| style="text-align:right;" | Independent
| style="text-align:right;" |741
| style="text-align:right;" |
| style="text-align:center;" |
|-

| style="text-align:left;" | Richard Griffith
| style="text-align:right;" | Independent
| style="text-align:right;" |583
| style="text-align:right;" |
| style="text-align:center;" |
|-

| style="text-align:left;" | William Shaw
| style="text-align:right;" | Independent
| style="text-align:right;" |232
| style="text-align:right;" |
| style="text-align:center;" |
|-
| style="text-align:right;background-color:#FFFFFF;" colspan="3" |Total votes
| style="text-align:right;background-color:#FFFFFF;" colspan="1" |
| style="text-align:right;background-color:#FFFFFF;" colspan="2" |
|- 
| style="text-align:right;background-color:#FFFFFF;" colspan="3" |Registered voters
| style="text-align:right;background-color:#FFFFFF;" |
| style="text-align:right;background-color:#FFFFFF;" colspan="1" |
| style="text-align:left;background-color:#FFFFFF;" colspan="1" |
|- 
| style="text-align:left;" colspan="6" |Note: Candidate campaign colours are used as a visual differentiation between candidates and to indicate affiliation.
|- 
| style="text-align:left;" colspan="13" |Sources: "Recapitulation for the aldermen", Hamilton Spectator, December 3, 1935, pp. 15."Conservative Majority in New Council," Hamilton Spectator, December 3, 1935, pp. 7.
|}

Ward Three

|-
!rowspan="2" colspan="2"|Candidate
!rowspan="2" colspan="1"|Affiliation
!colspan="2"|Popular vote
!rowspan="2"| Elected?
|-
! Votes
! %
|-

| style="text-align:left;" | Robert Evans (incumbent)
| style="text-align:right;" | Independent Conservative
| style="text-align:right;" |2,219
| style="text-align:right;" |
| style="text-align:center;" |
|-

| style="text-align:left;" | Herbert Smye
| style="text-align:right;" | Independent Conservative
| style="text-align:right;" |2,110
| style="text-align:right;" |
| style="text-align:center;" |
|-

| style="text-align:left;" | William Fick (incumbent)
| style="text-align:right;" | Independent Conservative
| style="text-align:right;" |1,740
| style="text-align:right;" |
| style="text-align:center;" |
|-

| style="text-align:left;" | Austin MacAuley
| style="text-align:right;" | Independent
| style="text-align:right;" |1,633
| style="text-align:right;" |
| style="text-align:center;" |
|-
| style="text-align:right;background-color:#FFFFFF;" colspan="3" |Total votes
| style="text-align:right;background-color:#FFFFFF;" colspan="1" |
| style="text-align:right;background-color:#FFFFFF;" colspan="2" |
|- 
| style="text-align:right;background-color:#FFFFFF;" colspan="3" |Registered voters
| style="text-align:right;background-color:#FFFFFF;" |
| style="text-align:right;background-color:#FFFFFF;" colspan="1" |
| style="text-align:left;background-color:#FFFFFF;" colspan="1" |
|- 
| style="text-align:left;" colspan="6" |Note: Candidate campaign colours are used as a visual differentiation between candidates and to indicate affiliation.
|- 
| style="text-align:left;" colspan="13" |Sources: "Recapitulation for the aldermen", Hamilton Spectator, December 3, 1935, pp. 15."Conservative Majority in New Council," Hamilton Spectator, December 3, 1935, pp. 7.
|}

Ward Four

|-
!rowspan="2" colspan="2"|Candidate
!rowspan="2" colspan="1"|Affiliation
!colspan="2"|Popular vote
!rowspan="2"| Elected?
|-
! Votes
! %
|-

| style="text-align:left;" | John Marsh 
| style="text-align:right;" | Independent Liberal
| style="text-align:right;" |1,647
| style="text-align:right;" |
| style="text-align:center;" |
|-

| style="text-align:left;" | Peter McCulloch 
| style="text-align:right;" | Independent Liberal
| style="text-align:right;" |1,536
| style="text-align:right;" |
| style="text-align:center;" |
|-

| style="text-align:left;" | George Hancock (incumbent)
| style="text-align:right;" | Independent Conservative
| style="text-align:right;" |1,298
| style="text-align:right;" |
| style="text-align:center;" |
|-

| style="text-align:left;" | John Rowley
| style="text-align:right;" | Independent
| style="text-align:right;" |821
| style="text-align:right;" |
| style="text-align:center;" |
|-

| style="text-align:left;" | Charles Pollicott
| style="text-align:right;" |Independent Labour Party
| style="text-align:right;" |647
| style="text-align:right;" |
| style="text-align:center;" |
|-
| style="text-align:right;background-color:#FFFFFF;" colspan="3" |Total votes
| style="text-align:right;background-color:#FFFFFF;" colspan="1" |
| style="text-align:right;background-color:#FFFFFF;" colspan="2" |
|- 
| style="text-align:right;background-color:#FFFFFF;" colspan="3" |Registered voters
| style="text-align:right;background-color:#FFFFFF;" |
| style="text-align:right;background-color:#FFFFFF;" colspan="1" |
| style="text-align:left;background-color:#FFFFFF;" colspan="1" |
|- 
| style="text-align:left;" colspan="6" |Note: Candidate campaign colours are used as a visual differentiation between candidates and to indicate affiliation.
|- 
| style="text-align:left;" colspan="13" |Sources: "Recapitulation for the aldermen", Hamilton Spectator, December 3, 1935, pp. 15."Conservative Majority in New Council," Hamilton Spectator, December 3, 1935, pp. 7.
|}

Ward Five

|-
!rowspan="2" colspan="2"|Candidate
!rowspan="2" colspan="1"|Affiliation
!colspan="2"|Popular vote
!rowspan="2"| Elected?
|-
! Votes
! %
|-

| style="text-align:left;" | Thomas White (incumbent)
| style="text-align:right;" | Independent Conservative
| style="text-align:right;" |2,246
| style="text-align:right;" |
| style="text-align:center;" |
|-

| style="text-align:left;" | Alexander Nelligan 
| style="text-align:right;" | Independent Conservative
| style="text-align:right;" |1,163
| style="text-align:right;" |
| style="text-align:center;" |
|-

| style="text-align:left;" | Charles Aitchison
| style="text-align:right;" | Independent
| style="text-align:right;" |1,114
| style="text-align:right;" |
| style="text-align:center;" |
|-

| style="text-align:left;" | John Sherring
| style="text-align:right;" | Independent
| style="text-align:right;" |693
| style="text-align:right;" |
| style="text-align:center;" |
|-

| style="text-align:left;" | William Ronald
| style="text-align:right;" | Independent
| style="text-align:right;" |479
| style="text-align:right;" |
| style="text-align:center;" |
|-

| style="text-align:left;" | John Rae
| style="text-align:right;" | Cooperative Commonwealth Federation
| style="text-align:right;" |430
| style="text-align:right;" |
| style="text-align:center;" |
|-
| style="background-color:#C41E3A;" |
| style="text-align:left;" | Michael Hutchison
| style="text-align:right;" | Communist Party
| style="text-align:right;" |330
| style="text-align:right;" |
| style="text-align:right;" |
|-

| style="text-align:left;" | Herbert Savage
| style="text-align:right;" | Independent
| style="text-align:right;" |124
| style="text-align:right;" |
| style="text-align:center;" |
|-
| style="text-align:right;background-color:#FFFFFF;" colspan="3" |Total votes
| style="text-align:right;background-color:#FFFFFF;" colspan="1" |
| style="text-align:right;background-color:#FFFFFF;" colspan="2" |
|- 
| style="text-align:right;background-color:#FFFFFF;" colspan="3" |Registered voters
| style="text-align:right;background-color:#FFFFFF;" |
| style="text-align:right;background-color:#FFFFFF;" colspan="1" |
| style="text-align:left;background-color:#FFFFFF;" colspan="1" |
|- 
| style="text-align:left;" colspan="6" |Note: Candidate campaign colours are used as a visual differentiation between candidates and to indicate affiliation.
|- 
| style="text-align:left;" colspan="13" |Sources: "Recapitulation for the aldermen", Hamilton Spectator, December 3, 1935, pp. 15."Conservative Majority in New Council," Hamilton Spectator, December 3, 1935, pp. 7.
|}

Ward Six

|-
!rowspan="2" colspan="2"|Candidate
!rowspan="2" colspan="1"|Affiliation
!colspan="2"|Popular vote
!rowspan="2"| Elected?
|-
! Votes
! %
|-

| style="text-align:left;" | William Weir (incumbent)
| style="text-align:right;" | Independent Conservative
| style="text-align:right;" |2,774
| style="text-align:right;" |
| style="text-align:center;" |
|-

| style="text-align:left;" | John Hodgson (incumbent)
| style="text-align:right;" | Independent Conservative
| style="text-align:right;" |2,369
| style="text-align:right;" |
| style="text-align:center;" |
|-

| style="text-align:left;" | Archie Pollock
| style="text-align:right;" | Independent
| style="text-align:right;" |2,058
| style="text-align:right;" |
| style="text-align:center;" |
|-

| style="text-align:left;" | Frank Thomson
| style="text-align:right;" | Cooperative Commonwealth Federation
| style="text-align:right;" |915
| style="text-align:right;" |
| style="text-align:center;" |
|-
| style="background-color:#C41E3A;" |
| style="text-align:left;" | Bruce Smith
| style="text-align:right;" | Communist Party
| style="text-align:right;" |383
| style="text-align:right;" |
| style="text-align:right;" |
|-
| style="text-align:right;background-color:#FFFFFF;" colspan="3" |Total votes
| style="text-align:right;background-color:#FFFFFF;" colspan="1" |
| style="text-align:right;background-color:#FFFFFF;" colspan="2" |
|- 
| style="text-align:right;background-color:#FFFFFF;" colspan="3" |Registered voters
| style="text-align:right;background-color:#FFFFFF;" |
| style="text-align:right;background-color:#FFFFFF;" colspan="1" |
| style="text-align:left;background-color:#FFFFFF;" colspan="1" |
|- 
| style="text-align:left;" colspan="6" |Note: Candidate campaign colours are used as a visual differentiation between candidates and to indicate affiliation.
|- 
| style="text-align:left;" colspan="13" |Sources: "Recapitulation for the aldermen", Hamilton Spectator, December 3, 1935, pp. 15."Conservative Majority in New Council," Hamilton Spectator, December 3, 1935, pp. 7.
|}

Ward Seven

|-
!rowspan="2" colspan="2"|Candidate
!rowspan="2" colspan="1"|Affiliation
!colspan="2"|Popular vote
!rowspan="2"| Elected?
|-
! Votes
! %
|-

| style="text-align:left;" | Donald Clark
| style="text-align:right;" | Independent Reconstructionist
| style="text-align:right;" |1,776
| style="text-align:right;" |
| style="text-align:center;" |
|-

| style="text-align:left;" | Archie Burton (incumbent)
| style="text-align:right;" | Independent Conservative
| style="text-align:right;" |1,305
| style="text-align:right;" |
| style="text-align:center;" |
|-

| style="text-align:left;" | Sam Clarke
| style="text-align:right;" | Independent
| style="text-align:right;" |1,256
| style="text-align:right;" |
| style="text-align:center;" |
|-

| style="text-align:left;" | James Morris
| style="text-align:right;" | Independent
| style="text-align:right;" |1,170
| style="text-align:right;" |
| style="text-align:center;" |
|-

| style="text-align:left;" | John Watson
| style="text-align:right;" | Independent
| style="text-align:right;" |628
| style="text-align:right;" |
| style="text-align:center;" |
|-

| style="text-align:left;" | John Doyle
| style="text-align:right;" | Cooperative Commonwealth Federation
| style="text-align:right;" |462
| style="text-align:right;" |
| style="text-align:center;" |
|-

| style="text-align:left;" | James Newell
| style="text-align:right;" | Cooperative Commonwealth Federation
| style="text-align:right;" |358
| style="text-align:right;" |
| style="text-align:center;" |
|-
| style="text-align:right;background-color:#FFFFFF;" colspan="3" |Total votes
| style="text-align:right;background-color:#FFFFFF;" colspan="1" |
| style="text-align:right;background-color:#FFFFFF;" colspan="2" |
|- 
| style="text-align:right;background-color:#FFFFFF;" colspan="3" |Registered voters
| style="text-align:right;background-color:#FFFFFF;" |
| style="text-align:right;background-color:#FFFFFF;" colspan="1" |
| style="text-align:left;background-color:#FFFFFF;" colspan="1" |
|- 
| style="text-align:left;" colspan="6" |Note: Candidate campaign colours are used as a visual differentiation between candidates and to indicate affiliation.
|- 
| style="text-align:left;" colspan="13" |Sources: "Recapitulation for the aldermen", Hamilton Spectator, December 3, 1935, pp. 15."Conservative Majority in New Council," Hamilton Spectator, December 3, 1935, pp. 7.
|}

Ward Eight

|-
!rowspan="2" colspan="2"|Candidate
!rowspan="2" colspan="1"|Affiliation
!colspan="2"|Popular vote
!rowspan="2"| Elected?
|-
! Votes
! %
|-

| style="text-align:left;" | Agnes Sharpe (incumbent)
| style="text-align:right;" | Cooperative Commonwealth Federation
| style="text-align:right;" |2,191
| style="text-align:right;" |
| style="text-align:center;" |
|-

| style="text-align:left;" | Robert Elliott 
| style="text-align:right;" | Independent Conservative
| style="text-align:right;" |1,871
| style="text-align:right;" |
| style="text-align:center;" |
|-

| style="text-align:left;" | George Snyder
| style="text-align:right;" | Independent
| style="text-align:right;" |1,630
| style="text-align:right;" |
| style="text-align:center;" |
|-

| style="text-align:left;" | Roy Aindow
| style="text-align:right;" | Cooperative Commonwealth Federation
| style="text-align:right;" |1,166
| style="text-align:right;" |
| style="text-align:center;" |
|-

| style="text-align:left;" | Thomas Ellis
| style="text-align:right;" | Independent
| style="text-align:right;" |708
| style="text-align:right;" |
| style="text-align:center;" |
|-
| style="text-align:right;background-color:#FFFFFF;" colspan="3" |Total votes
| style="text-align:right;background-color:#FFFFFF;" colspan="1" |
| style="text-align:right;background-color:#FFFFFF;" colspan="2" |
|- 
| style="text-align:right;background-color:#FFFFFF;" colspan="3" |Registered voters
| style="text-align:right;background-color:#FFFFFF;" |
| style="text-align:right;background-color:#FFFFFF;" colspan="1" |
| style="text-align:left;background-color:#FFFFFF;" colspan="1" |
|- 
| style="text-align:left;" colspan="6" |Note: Candidate campaign colours are used as a visual differentiation between candidates and to indicate affiliation.
|- 
| style="text-align:left;" colspan="13" |Sources: "Recapitulation for the aldermen", Hamilton Spectator, December 3, 1935, pp. 15."Conservative Majority in New Council," Hamilton Spectator, December 3, 1935, pp. 7.
|}

Board of Education

Ward One

|-
!rowspan="2" colspan="2"|Candidate
!rowspan="2" colspan="1"|Affiliation
!colspan="2"|Popular vote
!rowspan="2"| Elected?
|-
! Votes
! %
|-

| style="text-align:left;" | Russell William Treleaven (incumbent)
| style="text-align:right;" | Independent
!colspan="2" style="text-align:right;" |Acclaimed
| style="text-align:center;" |
|-
| style="text-align:right;background-color:#FFFFFF;" colspan="3" |Total votes
| style="text-align:right;background-color:#FFFFFF;" colspan="1" |
| style="text-align:right;background-color:#FFFFFF;" colspan="2" |
|- 
| style="text-align:right;background-color:#FFFFFF;" colspan="3" |Registered voters
| style="text-align:right;background-color:#FFFFFF;" |
| style="text-align:right;background-color:#FFFFFF;" colspan="1" |
| style="text-align:left;background-color:#FFFFFF;" colspan="1" |
|- 
| style="text-align:left;" colspan="6" |Note: Candidate campaign colours are used as a visual differentiation between candidates and to indicate affiliation.
|- 
| style="text-align:left;" colspan="13" |Sources: "Five School Trustees Are Not Opposed", Hamilton Spectator, November 22, 1935, pp. 7,17.
|}

Ward Two

|-
!rowspan="2" colspan="2"|Candidate
!rowspan="2" colspan="1"|Affiliation
!colspan="2"|Popular vote
!rowspan="2"| Elected?
|-
! Votes
! %
|-

| style="text-align:left;" | George Tweedle Inch (incumbent)
| style="text-align:right;" | Independent
!colspan="2" style="text-align:right;" |Acclaimed
| style="text-align:center;" |
|-
| style="text-align:right;background-color:#FFFFFF;" colspan="3" |Total votes
| style="text-align:right;background-color:#FFFFFF;" colspan="1" |
| style="text-align:right;background-color:#FFFFFF;" colspan="2" |
|- 
| style="text-align:right;background-color:#FFFFFF;" colspan="3" |Registered voters
| style="text-align:right;background-color:#FFFFFF;" |
| style="text-align:right;background-color:#FFFFFF;" colspan="1" |
| style="text-align:left;background-color:#FFFFFF;" colspan="1" |
|- 
| style="text-align:left;" colspan="6" |Note: Candidate campaign colours are used as a visual differentiation between candidates and to indicate affiliation.
|- 
| style="text-align:left;" colspan="13" |Sources: "Five School Trustees Are Not Opposed", Hamilton Spectator, November 22, 1935, pp. 7,17.
|}

Ward Three

|-
!rowspan="2" colspan="2"|Candidate
!rowspan="2" colspan="1"|Affiliation
!colspan="2"|Popular vote
!rowspan="2"| Elected?
|-
! Votes
! %
|-

| style="text-align:left;" | S.B. Russell (incumbent)
| style="text-align:right;" | Independent
!colspan="2" style="text-align:right;" |Acclaimed
| style="text-align:center;" |
|-
| style="text-align:right;background-color:#FFFFFF;" colspan="3" |Total votes
| style="text-align:right;background-color:#FFFFFF;" colspan="1" |
| style="text-align:right;background-color:#FFFFFF;" colspan="2" |
|- 
| style="text-align:right;background-color:#FFFFFF;" colspan="3" |Registered voters
| style="text-align:right;background-color:#FFFFFF;" |
| style="text-align:right;background-color:#FFFFFF;" colspan="1" |
| style="text-align:left;background-color:#FFFFFF;" colspan="1" |
|- 
| style="text-align:left;" colspan="6" |Note: Candidate campaign colours are used as a visual differentiation between candidates and to indicate affiliation.
|- 
| style="text-align:left;" colspan="13" |Sources: "Five School Trustees Are Not Opposed", Hamilton Spectator, November 22, 1935, pp. 7,17.
|}

Ward Four

|-
!rowspan="2" colspan="2"|Candidate
!rowspan="2" colspan="1"|Affiliation
!colspan="2"|Popular vote
!rowspan="2"| Elected?
|-
! Votes
! %
|-

| style="text-align:left;" | George R. Allan (incumbent)
| style="text-align:right;" | Independent Conservative
!colspan="2" style="text-align:right;" |Acclaimed
| style="text-align:center;" |
|-
| style="text-align:right;background-color:#FFFFFF;" colspan="3" |Total votes
| style="text-align:right;background-color:#FFFFFF;" colspan="1" |
| style="text-align:right;background-color:#FFFFFF;" colspan="2" |
|- 
| style="text-align:right;background-color:#FFFFFF;" colspan="3" |Registered voters
| style="text-align:right;background-color:#FFFFFF;" |
| style="text-align:right;background-color:#FFFFFF;" colspan="1" |
| style="text-align:left;background-color:#FFFFFF;" colspan="1" |
|- 
| style="text-align:left;" colspan="6" |Note: Candidate campaign colours are used as a visual differentiation between candidates and to indicate affiliation.
|- 
| style="text-align:left;" colspan="13" |Sources: "Five School Trustees Are Not Opposed", Hamilton Spectator, November 22, 1935, pp. 7,17.
|}

Ward Five

|-
!rowspan="2" colspan="2"|Candidate
!rowspan="2" colspan="1"|Affiliation
!colspan="2"|Popular vote
!rowspan="2"| Elected?
|-
! Votes
! %
|-

| style="text-align:left;" | Humphrey Mitchell 
| style="text-align:right;" | Independent Liberal-Labour
!colspan="2" style="text-align:right;" |Acclaimed
| style="text-align:center;" |
|-
| style="text-align:right;background-color:#FFFFFF;" colspan="3" |Total votes
| style="text-align:right;background-color:#FFFFFF;" colspan="1" |
| style="text-align:right;background-color:#FFFFFF;" colspan="2" |
|- 
| style="text-align:right;background-color:#FFFFFF;" colspan="3" |Registered voters
| style="text-align:right;background-color:#FFFFFF;" |
| style="text-align:right;background-color:#FFFFFF;" colspan="1" |
| style="text-align:left;background-color:#FFFFFF;" colspan="1" |
|- 
| style="text-align:left;" colspan="6" |Note: Candidate campaign colours are used as a visual differentiation between candidates and to indicate affiliation.
|- 
| style="text-align:left;" colspan="13" |Sources: "Five School Trustees Are Not Opposed", Hamilton Spectator, November 22, 1935, pp. 7,17.
|}

Ward Six

|-
!rowspan="2" colspan="2"|Candidate
!rowspan="2" colspan="1"|Affiliation
!colspan="2"|Popular vote
!rowspan="2"| Elected?
|-
! Votes
! %
|-

| style="text-align:left;" | George Henry Wild (incumbent)
| style="text-align:right;" | Independent Conservative
| style="text-align:right;" |2,920
| style="text-align:right;" |
| style="text-align:center;" |
|-

| style="text-align:left;" | John McGregor
| style="text-align:right;" | Cooperative Commonwealth Federation
| style="text-align:right;" |1,739
| style="text-align:right;" |
| style="text-align:center;" |
|-
| style="text-align:right;background-color:#FFFFFF;" colspan="3" |Total votes
| style="text-align:right;background-color:#FFFFFF;" colspan="1" |
| style="text-align:right;background-color:#FFFFFF;" colspan="2" |
|- 
| style="text-align:right;background-color:#FFFFFF;" colspan="3" |Registered voters
| style="text-align:right;background-color:#FFFFFF;" |
| style="text-align:right;background-color:#FFFFFF;" colspan="1" |
| style="text-align:left;background-color:#FFFFFF;" colspan="1" |
|- 
| style="text-align:left;" colspan="6" |Note: Candidate campaign colours are used as a visual differentiation between candidates and to indicate affiliation.
|- 
| style="text-align:left;" colspan="13" |Sources: "Five School Trustees Are Not Opposed", Hamilton Spectator, November 22, 1935, pp. 7,17."Recapitulation for School Trustees", Hamilton Spectator, December 3, 1935, pp. 15.
|}

Ward Seven

|-
!rowspan="2" colspan="2"|Candidate
!rowspan="2" colspan="1"|Affiliation
!colspan="2"|Popular vote
!rowspan="2"| Elected?
|-
! Votes
! %
|-

| style="text-align:left;" | Henry Bickel (incumbent)
| style="text-align:right;" | Independent
| style="text-align:right;" |1,981
| style="text-align:right;" |
| style="text-align:center;" |
|-

| style="text-align:left;" | Issac Armes
| style="text-align:right;" | Cooperative Commonwealth Federation
| style="text-align:right;" |1,531
| style="text-align:right;" |
| style="text-align:center;" |
|-
| style="text-align:right;background-color:#FFFFFF;" colspan="3" |Total votes
| style="text-align:right;background-color:#FFFFFF;" colspan="1" |
| style="text-align:right;background-color:#FFFFFF;" colspan="2" |
|- 
| style="text-align:right;background-color:#FFFFFF;" colspan="3" |Registered voters
| style="text-align:right;background-color:#FFFFFF;" |
| style="text-align:right;background-color:#FFFFFF;" colspan="1" |
| style="text-align:left;background-color:#FFFFFF;" colspan="1" |
|- 
| style="text-align:left;" colspan="6" |Note: Candidate campaign colours are used as a visual differentiation between candidates and to indicate affiliation.
|- 
| style="text-align:left;" colspan="13" |Sources: "Five School Trustees Are Not Opposed", Hamilton Spectator, November 22, 1935, pp. 7,17."Recapitulation for School Trustees", Hamilton Spectator, December 3, 1935, pp. 15.
|}

Ward Eight

|-
!rowspan="2" colspan="2"|Candidate
!rowspan="2" colspan="1"|Affiliation
!colspan="2"|Popular vote
!rowspan="2"| Elected?
|-
! Votes
! %
|-

| style="text-align:left;" | Goldwin Henry (incumbent)
| style="text-align:right;" | Independent
| style="text-align:right;" |2,050
| style="text-align:right;" |
| style="text-align:center;" |
|-

| style="text-align:left;" | Sara Doyle
| style="text-align:right;" | Cooperative Commonwealth Federation
| style="text-align:right;" |1,552
| style="text-align:right;" |
| style="text-align:center;" |
|-
| style="text-align:right;background-color:#FFFFFF;" colspan="3" |Total votes
| style="text-align:right;background-color:#FFFFFF;" colspan="1" |
| style="text-align:right;background-color:#FFFFFF;" colspan="2" |
|- 
| style="text-align:right;background-color:#FFFFFF;" colspan="3" |Registered voters
| style="text-align:right;background-color:#FFFFFF;" |
| style="text-align:right;background-color:#FFFFFF;" colspan="1" |
| style="text-align:left;background-color:#FFFFFF;" colspan="1" |
|- 
| style="text-align:left;" colspan="6" |Note: Candidate campaign colours are used as a visual differentiation between candidates and to indicate affiliation.
|- 
| style="text-align:left;" colspan="13" |Sources: "Five School Trustees Are Not Opposed", Hamilton Spectator, November 22, 1935, pp. 7,17."Recapitulation for School Trustees", Hamilton Spectator, December 3, 1935, pp. 15.
|}

References

1935
1935 in Ontario
Hamilton